"(You've Got Me) Dangling on a String" is a 1970 soul music song by the Chairmen of the Board. The single reached No. 38 on the US Billboard Hot 100, No. 19 on the US Billboard R&B chart, and No. 5 on the UK Singles Chart. The song was written by Ronald Dunbar and Edythe Wayne.

Live performances
The group performed "Dangling on a String" on American Bandstand on May 16, 1970.

Chart history
Chairmen of the Board

Donny Osmond

Cover versions
The song was covered by Donny Osmond, and released as a single from the August 1977 album Donald Clark Osmond, "bubbling under" the Billboard Hot 100 chart at number 109. Catalogue number PD 14417, Int'l. # 2066 847 77 NP 2827. It was produced by Brian Holland.
A version with substantially altered music was also recorded by the UK post-punk band C Cat Trance, on their album Play Masenko Combo and as the B-side of their 1984 single "Dreams Of Leaving" (Ink INK123).
In 1988, "Danglin' on a String" was also covered by Boys Club for their eponymous debut album and released as their third and final single, in 1989, on MCA Records (MCA-53649).

External links
Lyrics of this song
  (Chairmen of the Board)

References

1970 songs
1970 singles
1977 singles
Chairmen of the Board songs
Donny Osmond songs
Songs written by Holland–Dozier–Holland
Songs written by Ron Dunbar